Willibald Walter Stanek (4 December 1913 - 4 June 2007) was an Austrian ice hockey player who competed for the Austrian national team at the 1936 Winter Olympics in Garmisch-Partenkirchen and the 1948 Winter Olympics in Saint-Moritz. He played a total of 14 games at the two Olympics.

Stanek also made 18 appearances for the Austrian national team at the World Championships between 1935 and 1949, scoring four goals. He played club hockey for Wiener EV in the Austrian Hockey Championship.

References

External links
 

1913 births
2007 deaths
Austrian ice hockey players
Ice hockey people from Vienna
Ice hockey players at the 1936 Winter Olympics
Ice hockey players at the 1948 Winter Olympics
Olympic ice hockey players of Austria
Wiener EV players